The Battle of Garni was fought in 1225 near Garni, in modern day Armenia, then part of the Kingdom of Georgia. The invading Khwarazmian Empire was led by Jalal ad-Din Mingburnu, its last Sultan, who was driven from his realm by the Mongol Empire and was trying to recapture lost territories. The battle ended with a Khwarezmid victory and is marked as a disastrous event in Georgian history due to betrayal. As a result, the royal court of Georgian Queen Rusudan (1223–1245) moved to Kutaisi and the country was exposed to subsequent looting during the Mongol invasion.

Prelude
Jalal ad-Din Mingburnu sent an abasement letter to Queen Rusudan demanding subordination of Georgia under his rule. At the same time, he assembled a huge military force, asking for troops from his allies and nobles across the empire. The purpose was to completely crush the Kingdom of Georgia and take all its dominions successfully ceding its existence. The Georgian court and leadership had notes and reports about a possible intervention but did not consider it necessary to take measures since that threat was not taken seriously. Instead, the nobility replied by sending a letter that reminded Jalal ad-Din of his crushing defeat against the Mongols, while having no idea how strong his empire already was by then. In 1225, a large Khwarezmid army crossed the Georgian border and soon both parties met on the battlefield.

Strength
Under the command of Queen Rusudan, messengers were sent out to all regions of the Kingdom of Georgia in order to gather troops. During that period the kingdom had the potential to raise around 100,000 men in total including mercenaries. However the Georgians had reserved some forces for security reasons, thus leaving around 60–70,000 men for battle. The strength of the invading army far exceeded that of Rusudan's forces. According to Ata-Malik Juvayni, the army of Jalal ad-din was 30,000 men strong. While according to the unknown Georgian chronicler named "jamtaaghtsereli", the army of Jalal ad-din was 140,000 men strong. Armenian sources say that the Muslim coalition deployed up to 200,000 men.

Disposal
A Georgian vanguard of around 20,000 men led by the Toreli brothers - Shalva Akhaltiskheli and Ivane Akhaltsikheli rushed towards the Khwarazmid forces to secure areal dominance. While the Khwarazmians were disposed on lower ground and flat lands, the Georgian who had arrived earlier were deployed wisely on top of surrounding plateaus and established a strategic advantage for the arriving main army. General Mkhargrdzeli with his more than 50,000 warriors arrived in time and initially kept himself in the background being expected by the other commanders to react on any attack against his vanguard while remaining unnoticed by the enemy.

Battle
The battle began with Jalal ad-Dins left wing attacking the Georgian vanguard and it did not take long for his main forces to be ordered into fight. By that time, Shalva Toreli-Akhaltiskheli and Ivane Toreli-Akhaltsikheli had already sent several messengers to the commander of the main Georgian army asking him to strike the Khwarezmid rear as the vanguard was able to stabilize the front lines. Despite the crucial advantage of the terrain, relief for the vanguard became critically necessary. Mkhargrdzeli's army had still not replied and his Georgian army's main body remained absolutely stationary. A nearly perfect opportunity to force its enemy to fight against being encircled or caught in a pincer movement, was wasted. Soon the Georgian vanguard was breaking apart and finally got completely overrun. Commander Mkhargrdzeli then ordered his troops to abandon the battlefield entirely, leaving the other two commanders Shalva and Ivane Akhaltsikheli in their enemies' hands. Once again internal conflicts and personal feuds between Georgian grand feudal lords decisively crippled the Georgian kingdom's defences and its leaders power.

After the battle Tbilisi was sacked, allegedly a hundred thousand citizens were put to death for not renouncing Christianity.

A quarter of the Georgian army was annihilated, leaving the country poorly steeled against an upcoming Mongol invasion. The capture of Dvin brought about the end of Georgia's medieval heyday.

References

Bibliography
 Margarian, Hayrapet, "On the History of the Battle of Garni," Armenian Review 37/4 (Winter 1984): pp. 63–71.

Garni
Garni
Battles of the Middle Ages
Conflicts in 1225
Battle of Garni
Battle of Garni
13th century in the Kingdom of Georgia
Battle of Garni
Battles involving the Khwarazmian dynasty